Jack Larscheid (May 10, 1933 - February 5, 1980) was a player in the American Football League for the Oakland Raiders in 1960 and 1961 as a halfback. He played at the collegiate level at University of the Pacific.

Biography
Larscheid was born John Phillip Larscheid on May 10, 1933 in Whitefish Bay, Wisconsin. Some sources have listed him as dying in 1970, but the Social Security Death Index indicates he died in 1980, not 1970.

References

1933 births
1980 deaths
Oakland Raiders players
People from Whitefish Bay, Wisconsin
Players of American football from Wisconsin
Pacific Tigers football players
American Football League players